Karnice may refer to the following places in Poland:
Karnice, Środa Śląska County in Lower Silesian Voivodeship (south-west Poland)
Karnice, Trzebnica County in Lower Silesian Voivodeship (south-west Poland)
Karnice, Łódź Voivodeship (central Poland)
Karnice, Masovian Voivodeship (east-central Poland)
Karnice, Gryfice County in West Pomeranian Voivodeship (north-west Poland)
Karnice, Łobez County in West Pomeranian Voivodeship (north-west Poland)